Ottokar Domma (pseudonym; properly Otto Häuser) (20 May 1924, Karlovy Vary, Czechoslovakia – 15 July 2007, Woltersdorf) was a German journalist and writer specialising in satire.  He was most famous for his series on adventures of a semi-fictional East German schoolboy named Ottokar Domma. Domma is in parts the younger alter ego of Häuser.

Pseudonym 

Häuser's last name means 'houses' in German language; domma or doma means the same in Russian language.

1924 births
2007 deaths
Writers from Karlovy Vary
Sudeten German people
German male writers
Officers Crosses of the Order of Merit of the Federal Republic of Germany